Mark Dorazio is an American politician. He serves as a Republican member for the 122nd district of the Texas House of Representatives.

Life and career 
Dorazio was a businessperson.

In May 2022, Dorazio defeated Elisa Chan in the Republican primary election for the 122nd district of the Texas House of Representatives. In November 2022, he defeated Angi Aramburu and Stephanie Berlin in the general election, winning 56 percent of the votes. He succeeded Lyle Larson. He assumed office in 2023.

References 

Living people
Place of birth missing (living people)
Year of birth missing (living people)
Republican Party members of the Texas House of Representatives
21st-century American politicians